Giovanni "Gianni" Pelletier is an Italian former professional Grand Prix motorcycle racer.

Career statistics

By season

References

External links
 Profile on motogp.com

Living people
1954 births
Italian motorcycle racers
350cc World Championship riders
500cc World Championship riders
Sportspeople from Rome